Big Walnut Creek starts near Mount Gilead, Ohio in Morrow County. It flows south to eastern Delaware County and parallels Alum Creek. It passes to the east of Sunbury and into Hoover Reservoir, which then crosses into Franklin County. From the dam outflow in Westerville the creek flows through Gahanna and Whitehall. Near Obetz it is joined by its principal tributaries Alum Creek and Blacklick Creek at the Three Creeks Columbus Metro Park.

Name
Big Walnut Creek was named for black walnut trees which once grew in old-growth forests near the stream. According to the Geographic Names Information System, the Big Walnut Creek has also been known as:
Big Belly Creek
Big Bellys Creek
Big Lick Creek
Gahanna River
Hayes Ditch
Walnut Creek
Whingwy Mahoni Sepung
Menkwi Mhoani Siipunk

See also
List of rivers of Ohio

References

Rivers of Ohio
Rivers of Morrow County, Ohio
Rivers of Delaware County, Ohio
Rivers of Franklin County, Ohio